The 9th Central American and Caribbean Junior Championships were held in Havana, Cuba, between 6–8 July 1990.

Medal summary
Medal winners are published by category: Junior A, Male, Junior A, Female, and Junior B. 
Complete results can be found on the World Junior Athletics History website.

There are some differences between the results in the different sources.  The Rules for the Central American and Caribbean Track and Field Championships regulate : "Each country can enter a maximum of two (2) competitors per individual event with the exception of the 1/2 marathon in which three competitors
per country may be allowed."  Therefore, it is assumed that additional athletes from host country Cuba started out of competition, especially in the field events, and were not eligible for gaining championships medals.

Male Junior A (under 20)

Remarks:

1) Elsewhere, Daniel Osorio of Cuba is listed 3rd with 15.96m.

2) Elsewhere, Alberto Sánchez of Cuba is listed 3rd with 56.40m.

Female Junior A (under 20)

Remarks:

3) Elsewhere, Isabel Aldecoa of Cuba is listed 2nd with 1.70m and Diane Guthrie of Jamaica is listed 3rd.

4) Elsewhere, Ania Hurtado of Cuba is listed 3rd with 12.95m.

5) Elsewhere, Ania Hurtado of Cuba is listed 2nd with 47.14m and Taybis Gómez of Cuba is listed 3rd with 44.50m.

6) Elsewhere, Yaquelín García of Cuba is listed 3rd with 48.60m.

7) Elsewhere, Diosgracia Verdiof Cuba is listed 3rd with 4985pts.

Male Junior B (under 17)

Female Junior B (under 17)

Medal table (unofficial)

Participation (unofficial)

Detailed result lists can be found on the World Junior Athletics History website.  An unofficial count yields a number of about 406 athletes (219 junior (under-20) and 187 youth (under-17)) from about 12 countries:

 (36)
 (11)
 (25)
 (2)
 (115)
 (3)
 (39)
 México (68)
 (5)
 (59)
 (2)
 (41)

References

External links
Official CACAC Website
World Junior Athletics History

Central American and Caribbean Junior Championships in Athletics
International athletics competitions hosted by Cuba
1990 in Cuban sport
Central American and Caribbean Junior Championships
1990 in youth sport